The King of Arms of the Order of the British Empire is the herald of the Order of the British Empire, established in 1917 and effective since 1918.

Kings of Arms

Order of the British Empire
Order of the British Empire